Cuautla, Jalisco is a small town located in the hills of western Mexico. It is situated at an elevation of 5,639 ft. (1,719 m) between Guadalajara and Puerto Vallarta. It has fewer than 3,000 permanent residents.

Its name means place where eagles land, and was originally inhabited by people of the Cuyuteca culture.

Today it is primarily a town of senior citizens and children. Most people of productive age have elected to move to the United States of America seeking different opportunities. An estimated 400 Mexican restaurants in Washington, Iowa, Oregon, Colorado, California, North Carolina, Florida and Nebraska have been started by entrepreneurs from Cuautla. They operate under such trade names as Mazatlan, Casa De Oro, Hacienda Vieja, Ajuua, Azteca, Margaritas, Tequila's, Rancho Chico, 3 Margaritas, Ixtapa, Casa Bonita, Celia's, El Caporal, El Porton, Mayas, La Bamba, Los Cabos, Casa Tequila, La Fuente, Torero's, Plaza Jalisco, Casa Tapatia, Plaza Mexico, El Sombrero, Pueblo, Jalisco, Don Jose, Nuevo Vallarta, Paraiso Vallarta, and many others.

The central part of Cuautla is known as "The Plaza." it is mainly consists of the only supermarket of Cuautla, many stores, and a few restaurants.

Being gifted with ample economical success, people who left Cuautla return annually for the religious festivities, which take place between July 16–25. This "fiesta" is held in honor of Santiago Apóstol.

This is a very special time for Cuautla as this is when many of the sons and daughters of the people who went to the U.S.A. return to celebrate. These sons and daughters like to listen to their cultural music, Mariachi and Banda all night long. Odd for a small rural town, Cuautla residents have built a Plaza de Toros, (a venue for bullfights, horse shows, etc.) as well as a brand new airstrip. 
There is a widely unacknowledged archaeological site nearby, Las Águilas, and local legends talk about it as a site for UFO sightings.

In August 2001, the City of Renton, Washington established a new Sister City relationship with Cuautla. Fundamental to the special connection between Renton and Cuautla, are Cuautla's "Absent Sons", of whom many live in or near Renton. 

Municipalities of Jalisco